The Fromberghorn (or Fromberghore) is a mountain of the Bernese Alps, located between Diemtigen and Reichenbach im Kandertal in the Bernese Oberland. It lies just south of the Niesen.

References

External links

 Fromberghorn on Hikr

Mountains of the Alps
Mountains of Switzerland
Mountains of the canton of Bern
Two-thousanders of Switzerland